Tala Hamza is a town in northern Algeria.

Communes of Béjaïa Province
Cities in Algeria
Algeria